The Australia Women's National Wheelchair Basketball League (WNWBL) is a women's semi-professional wheelchair basketball league in Australia.

Teams
The league currently has six teams:

Sydney University Flames
The Sydney University Flames, as the Hills Hornets, were one of the league's original teams, and the most successful, winning the championship nine years in a row from 2002 to 2010. Seven-time Paralympian Liesl Tesch was one of the team's founding members, who was named the first overall MVP in 2000, and played for the team in 2017. The team became the Sydney University Flames in 2010, and won the league championship in 2019.

Sydney Metro Blues
The Sydney Metro Blues were also one the league's original teams, as the North Sydney Bears. As such, they won the league championship in 2001. They subsequently became the Goudcamp Gladiators, and then the Sachs Goudcamp Bears in 2011. They assumed their current identity of the Sydney Metro Blues in 2016, and won the league championship in 2017.

Kilsyth Cobras
Another of the original teams, the Kilsyth Cobras began as the Victorian Wheelies in 2000. They subsequently became the Dandenong Rangers, and won the league championship in 2011 and 2012 with players including Amanda Carter and Shelley Chaplin. In 2015, the team became affiliated with the Kilsyth Cobras, a club that also fields teams in the men’s and women’s sections of the South East Australian Basketball League (SEABL), the Victorian Youth Championship Competition (VYC), the Victorian Junior Basketball League (VJBL) and the National Wheelchair Basketball League (NWBL). The Kilsyth Cobras went through the 2015 season undefeated, posting a 16–0 record that still stands, and claimed the league championship.

Perth Wheelcats
The Perth Wheelcats (Formerly Be Active Western Stars) joined the league in 2006. The team quickly became a force in the competition, supplying three players (Amber Merritt, Sarah Vinci and Clare Nott) to the Australia women's national wheelchair basketball team at the 2012 Summer Paralympics, plus the coach, John Triscari. The Stars won league championships in 2013 and 2016, and Merritt was the 4.0 MVP and highest point scorer for nine years running from 2011 to 2019.

Queensland Comets 
The Queensland Comets (formerly the Minecraft Comets) became the league's fifth team in 2011. They won the league championship in 2014 and 2018.

Red Dust Lady Heelers
The Red Dust Lady Heelers became the league's sixth team in 2017, following the track of the  Red Dust Heelers, who joined the NWBL three years before. The Red Dust Heelers program grew out of the 2012 Outback Academy Australia. In its inaugural year in the competition, it was fortunate to have players like Deanna Smith, Kathleen O'Kelly-Kennedy, Clare Nott and Georgia Inglis.

Champions

Awards

Voted by the coaches and referees

Voted by the captain of each team.

References

External links

WBL Finals 2022

 
Women's basketball competitions in Australia
Wheelchair basketball leagues in Australia
Recurring sporting events established in 2000
2000 establishments in Australia
Sports leagues established in 2000